The LE-5 liquid rocket engine and its derivative models were developed in Japan to meet the need for an upper stage propulsion system for the H-I and H-II series of launch vehicles. It is a bipropellant design, using LH and LOX. Primary design and production work was carried out by Mitsubishi Heavy Industries. In terms of liquid rockets, it is a fairly small engine, both in size and thrust output, being in the 89 kN (20,000 lbf) and the more recent models the 130 kN (30,000 lbf) thrust class. The motor is capable of multiple restarts, due to a spark ignition system as opposed to the single use pyrotechnic or hypergolic igniters commonly used on some contemporary engines. Though rated for up to 16 starts and 40+ minutes of firing time, on the H-II the engine is considered expendable, being used for one flight and jettisoned. It is sometimes started only once for a nine-minute burn, but in missions to GTO the engine is often fired a second time to inject the payload into the higher orbit after a temporary low Earth orbit has been established.

The original LE-5 was built as a second stage engine for the H-I launch vehicle. It used a fairly conventional gas generator cycle.

LE-5A
The LE-5A was a heavily redesigned version of the LE-5 intended for use on the new H-II launch vehicle's second stage. The major difference is that the operation of the engine was switched from the gas generator to expander bleed cycle. The LE-5A was the world's first expander bleed cycle engine to be put into operational service. Cryogenic liquid hydrogen fuel for the cycle is drawn through tubes and passages in both the engine's nozzle and combustion chamber where the hydrogen heats up incredibly while simultaneously cooling those components. The heating of the initially cold fuel causes it to become significantly pressurized and it is utilized to drive the turbine for the propellant pumps.

LE-5B
The LE-5B (in Japanese) was a further modified version of the LE-5A. The changes focused on lowering the per-unit cost of the engine while continuing to increase reliability. The modifications veered towards simplification and cheaper production where possible at the cost of actually lowering the specific impulse to 447 seconds, the lowest of all three models. However, it produced the highest thrust of the three and was significantly cheaper. The primary change from the 5A model was that the 5B's expander bleed system circulated fuel around only the combustion chamber as opposed to both the chamber and the nozzle in the 5A. Alterations to the combustion chamber cooling passages and constituent materials were made with special emphasis on effective heat transfer to allow this method to be successful.

LE-5B-2
After flight F5 of H-IIA on March 28, 2003 resulted in severe (although not damaging) vibration of the upper stage during LE-5B firing, work was initiated on an upgraded version of the LE-5B. The upgraded engine, named LE-5B-2, was first flown on a H-IIB on September 10, 2009. The main fixes were adding flow-laminarizing plates in the expander manifold, a new mixer of gaseous and liquid hydrogen in the hydrogen feed line, and a new injector plate with 306 smaller coaxial injectors (versus 180 in LE-5B). See LE-5B-2 development summary (Japanese).
The upgrade reduced the vibrations produced by the upper stage by half.

LE-5B-3
For the new H3 launch vehicle, the veteran design of the LE-5B was once again revisited. To meet the requirements of the H3 and to ensure a stable supply of parts over H3's lifetime, performance was to be improved and costs were to be lowered, all while keeping development risk as low as possible. Obsolete parts that were becoming hard to acquire such as the electronics in the engine controller were to be replaced with modern components that could be reliably sourced for years to come, and the manufacturing method for the combustion chamber was to be likewise updated for similar reasons. The liquid hydrogen turbopump and turbine nozzle were to be updated for H3's longer mission duration times, and the performance of the liquid oxygen turbopump and fuel mixer was to be improved.

The first example of the updated design was test fired in March, 2017.

On the H3 launch vehicles first flight on March 7, 2023, the first stage, consisting of two SRB-3, and two LE-9 engines, performed nominally up until stage separation. Following separation, ignition of the LE-5B-3 could not be confirmed, and velocity started dropping significantly. At L+ 00:14:50, a self-destruct command was sent to H3. An investigation is currently ongoing.

Specifications

*, tank head pressure only

See also
 H-I Japanese carrier rocket
 H-II Japanese carrier rocket
 H-IIA Japanese carrier rocket
 H-IIB Japanese carrier rocket
 LE-7
 LE-9
 Development of the LE-X Engine, MHI Technical Review Vol. 48 No. 4

References

External links

Rocket engines of Japan
Rocket engines using hydrogen propellant
Rocket engines using the gas-generator cycle